Miracle Kelechi Chike (born March 24, 1998) popularly known as Miraboi is a Nigerian singer, songwriter, philanthropist, actor and an entrepreneur. His parents are from Abia State, Bende local government area in Nigeria but he was born and brought up in Lagos State, Ojo local government, Nigeria where he also started his early life career.

Early life 
Miracle Kelechi Chike was born and raised in a family of 7, 3 boys and 2 girls with his parents of which his the first son. In 2015, He started his career of being a graphic designer in the Nigerian Entertainment industry, helping notable musicians and brands in creating artworks. Growing up in a busy area of Lagos Miraboi had interest in doing music at the year (2015) but  Along the line, he had to go into business management to help his finances which made him gain recognition in the entertainment industry worldwide, since he now had connections as an entrepreneur. In 2016, Miraboi had his first street interview with Wazobia Max TV in Port Harcourt, one  of the biggest radio & Tv station in Nigeria while he was still at the university of Port harcourt year one.

Career

In 2016 he was granted his first opportunity to work with the Nigerian musician Sean Tizzle under the management of 715 media leakers as a public relations officer. There he moved globally and was known for some successful projects in the Nigeria entertainment industry and United States Of America. In 2019, Miraboi officially became a singer & a song writer. He then released his first song on 3 December 2019 titled “My Baby”. Miraboi gained more popularity from his Twitter handle after being mentioned by so many notable celebrities on Twitter such as his friends Hg2 Films, Samuel Mbah and also in a tweet where he supported Davido’s Endorsement deal in buying his mother an infinix Hot 9, he later featured Peruzzi on a song titled “Abena” which got massive airplays across Nigeria with a musical video.

Political awareness 
On the 6 October 2022, he made an awareness in donating for Peter Obi Nigeria presidential campaign 2023 on twitter.

Educational background
Miracle Kelechi Chike attended LASU nursery & primary school. Pushing forward on his educational background, he moved to MillBank Secondary School and graduated with a Weac result from Rolex Comprehensive College. Miracle Kelechi Chike studied Marketing at the University of Port Harcourt although he later dropped out and traveled outside Nigeria to further his education in music production.

Discography

Selected singles

Selected E.P

Award and nominations

References 

Living people
1998 births
Businesspeople from Lagos State
21st-century Nigerian businesspeople